The Kondakov Plateau is a mountain plateau in the Sakha Republic, Far Eastern Federal District, Russia. The town of Chokurdakh is located on the other bank of the Indigirka, facing the plateau. The nearest airport is Chokurdakh Airport.

The Shandrin mammoth was discovered in 1974 at the feet of a steep slope in the eastern side of the Kondakov Plateau by geologist B. S. Rusanov of the Yakutsk Institute of Geology.

Geography  
The Kondakov Plateau is located in eastern Yakutia, rising above the right banks of the lower course of the Indigirka and gradually decreasing in elevation to the east. There are slightly higher ridges cutting across the plateau area, the Bonga-Taga ridge in the north and the Mokholukan in the south.

The plateau is limited by the Yana-Indigirka Lowland to the west, with the delta of the Indigirka to the north. To the south it is bound by the Ulakhan-Sis Range and by the Kolyma Lowland to the east.

Hydrography
The Kondakov Plateau is crossed by rivers Shandrin to the east and the Sundrun with some of its upper course tributaries, as well as by the Bolshaya Ercha, a tributary of the Indigirka. The Malaya Ercha —the largest tributary of the Bolshaya Ercha, the Keremesit, as well as the Okhotnya and Barn-Yuryakh —tributaries of the Sakhartymay, have their sources in the plateau.

Flora and fauna
Permafrost prevails in the area of the Kondakov Plateau. The surface of the uplands is markedly dissected by river valleys in which there are forests of larch and forest tundra, especially in the southern part. Its higher elevations are covered with mountain tundra vegetation.

The Kondakov Plateau area is part of the migration corridor of the Sundrun reindeer population, which includes the adjoining Suor Uyata to the southeast, and the forest tundra of the Rossokha River basin to the east.

Climate
The plateau has a harsh subarctic climate. In summer the average July temperature in the valleys does not exceed .

Geology
Geologically the plateau is composed of sandstones, siltstones and schists of the Upper Jurassic. Andesites and basalts are present in some exposed crust parts of the plateau, where the local type of agate with a parallel-layered pattern can also be found.

References

External links
Physiogeography of the Russian Far East
Live Journal- Pictures

Plateaus of the Sakha Republic
ceb:Kondakovskoye Ploskogor'ye
de:Kondakow-Plateau
sah:Кондаков хаптал хайалаах сирэ